Gabriel Castaño (born 1 November 1997) is a Mexican swimmer. He competed in the men's 50 metre freestyle at the 2020 Summer Olympics.

See also
List of Pennsylvania State University Olympians

References

External links
 

1997 births
Living people
Mexican male swimmers
Mexican male freestyle swimmers
Olympic swimmers of Mexico
Swimmers at the 2020 Summer Olympics
Sportspeople from Monterrey
Swimmers at the 2019 Pan American Games
Medalists at the 2019 Pan American Games
Pan American Games bronze medalists for Mexico
Pan American Games medalists in swimming